Pleumeur-Bodou Ground Station was an early ground station in north-west France, and one of the first in the world. It was the site of the first satellite transmission between the US and Europe in the early morning of 11 July 1962 (French time), lasting 19 minutes on the satellite's seventh orbit.

History
The tracking station was developed by France Télécom, now known as Orange S.A. The site was built by the Centre national d'études des télécommunications, which became France Télécom R&D in 2000.

There was also another nearby tracking station at Lannion, which is also the landing point for the Apollo (cable system) from the USA.

First transatlantic satellite broadcast
The first transatlantic satellite broadcast took place at the site on the morning of 11 July 1962. Later that day, France broadcast back to the USA via the satellite.

Structure
The site is around three miles east of Trébeurden. The site has three large parabolic antennas.

Antennas
 PB8

See also
 Raisting Satellite Earth Station, in Germany
 TAT-1, first submarine transatlantic telephone cable, on 25 September 1956
 TAT-8, first transatlantic fibre-optic cable in 1988
 Transatlantic communications cable

References

External links
 NASA
 Parc du Radôme
 Site history (French)

1962 in technology
Buildings and structures in Côtes-d'Armor
Ground stations
History of Brittany
History of telecommunications in France
Industrial archaeological sites
Orange S.A.
Tourist attractions in Côtes-d'Armor
Transatlantic telecommunications
1962 establishments in France
Buildings and structures completed in 1962
20th-century architecture in France